Mariinsky (masculine), Mariinskaya (feminine), or Mariinskoye (neuter) may refer to:

Mariinsky Theatre 
Mariinsky Theatre in St. Petersburg, Russia, and the ensembles headquartered there:
Mariinsky Ballet
Mariinsky Opera
Mariinsky Orchestra
Mariinsky Academy of Young Singers; see soloist Eleonora Vindau
its concert hall, the Mariinsky Theatre Concert Hall
its second stage, the Mariinsky-2

Other 
Mariinsky, Republic of Bashkortostan, a selo in Otradovsky Selsoviet of Sterlitamaksky District, Republic of Bashkortostan
Mariinsky District, a district of Kemerovo Oblast, Russia
Mariinsky Hospital, a hospital in Meshchansky District, Moscow, Russia
Mariinsky Palace, a neoclassical imperial palace in St. Petersburg, Russia
Mariinskoye Urban Settlement, a municipal formation within the Mariinsky Municipal District

See also
Mariinsko-Posadsky (disambiguation)
Mariinsky Posad, a town in the Chuvash Republic, Russia
Marfo-Mariinsky Convent
Mariinskyi (disambiguation)